The arrondissement of Montauban is an arrondissement of France in the Tarn-et-Garonne department in the Occitanie region. It has 92 communes.

Composition

The communes of the arrondissement of Montauban, and their INSEE codes, are:

 Albias (82002)
 Aucamville (82005)
 Auty (82007)
 Beaupuy (82014)
 Bessens (82017)
 Bioule (82018)
 Bouillac (82020)
 Bourret (82023)
 Bressols (82025)
 Bruniquel (82026)
 Campsas (82027)
 Canals (82028)
 Castanet (82029)
 Caussade (82037)
 Caylus (82038)
 Cayrac (82039)
 Cayriech (82040)
 Cazals (82041)
 Comberouger (82043)
 Corbarieu (82044)
 Dieupentale (82048)
 Escatalens (82052)
 Espinas (82056)
 Fabas (82057)
 Féneyrols (82061)
 Finhan (82062)
 Génébrières (82066)
 Ginals (82069)
 Grisolles (82075)
 La Salvetat-Belmontet (82176)
 La Ville-Dieu-du-Temple (82096)
 Labarthe (82077)
 Labastide-de-Penne (82078)
 Labastide-Saint-Pierre (82079)
 Lacapelle-Livron (82082)
 Lacourt-Saint-Pierre (82085)
 Lafrançaise (82087)
 Laguépie (82088)
 Lamothe-Capdeville (82090)
 Lapenche (82092)
 Lavaurette (82095)
 Léojac (82098)
 L'Honor-de-Cos (82076)
 Loze (82100)
 Mas-Grenier (82105)
 Mirabel (82110)
 Molières (82113)
 Monbéqui (82114)
 Monclar-de-Quercy (82115)
 Montalzat (82119)
 Montastruc (82120)
 Montauban (82121)
 Montbartier (82123)
 Montbeton (82124)
 Montech (82125)
 Monteils (82126)
 Montfermier (82128)
 Montpezat-de-Quercy (82131)
 Montricoux (82132)
 Mouillac (82133)
 Nègrepelisse (82134)
 Nohic (82135)
 Orgueil (82136)
 Parisot (82137)
 Piquecos (82140)
 Pompignan (82142)
 Puycornet (82144)
 Puygaillard-de-Quercy (82145)
 Puylagarde (82147)
 Puylaroque (82148)
 Réalville (82149)
 Reyniès (82150)
 Saint-Antonin-Noble-Val (82155)
 Saint-Cirq (82159)
 Saint-Étienne-de-Tulmont (82161)
 Saint-Georges (82162)
 Saint-Nauphary (82167)
 Saint-Porquier (82171)
 Saint-Projet (82172)
 Saint-Sardos (82173)
 Saint-Vincent-d'Autéjac (82174)
 Savenès (82178)
 Septfonds (82179)
 Vaïssac (82184)
 Varen (82187)
 Varennes (82188)
 Vazerac (82189)
 Verdun-sur-Garonne (82190)
 Verfeil (82191)
 Verlhac-Tescou (82192)
 Villebrumier (82194)
 Villemade (82195)

History

The arrondissement of Montauban was created in 1800 as part of the department Lot. It became part of the new department Tarn-et-Garonne in 1808.

As a result of the reorganisation of the cantons of France which came into effect in 2015, the borders of the cantons are no longer related to the borders of the arrondissements. The cantons of the arrondissement of Montauban were, as of January 2015:

 Caussade
 Caylus
 Grisolles
 Lafrançaise
 Molières
 Monclar-de-Quercy
 Montauban-1
 Montauban-2
 Montauban-3
 Montauban-4
 Montauban-5
 Montauban-6
 Montech
 Montpezat-de-Quercy
 Nègrepelisse
 Saint-Antonin-Noble-Val
 Verdun-sur-Garonne
 Villebrumier

References

Montauban